Afro-Surinamese are the inhabitants of Suriname of Sub-Saharan African ancestry. They are descended from enslaved Africans brought to work on sugar plantations. Many of them escaped the plantations and formed independent settlements together, becoming known as Maroons and Bushinengue. They maintained vestiges of African culture and language. They are split into two ethnic subgroups (Creoles and Maroons).

Origins 
Most of the enslaved people imported to Suriname came from West Central Africa (circa 61,500 slaves, 27% of the total number), Gold Coast (Ghana) (circa 46,000, 21% of the total), Windward Coast (circa 45,000, 20%), and Bight of Benin (more than 32,000, 14% of the total). Thousands of enslaved people also arrived from Bight of Biafra (circa 11,000, 5.0% of the total) and Sierra Leone (circa 3,600, 1.6% of the total). The total number of enslaved people was estimated at 220,000.

The Akans from the central Ghana were, officially, the predominant ethnic group of slaves in Suriname. However, in practice, enslaved people from Loango, purchased in Cabinda, Angola, were the largest group of slaves in Suriname since 1670; they surpassed the number on the Gold Coast in almost all periods. Enslaved people including the Ewe (who live in southern Ghana, Togo and Benin), Igbo (from Nigeria), Yoruba (from Benin) and Kongo (who live in the Republic of Congo, Democratic Republic of the Congo and Angola), all left their cultural footprints in Suriname.

History
The Dutch were involved in the slave trade during the early colonial years. They sought office space for their plantations. The space they received was when the British in the Treaty of Breda (1667) gave land on the northern coast of South America, ceded to them in exchange for New York. Suriname became a slave colony. Slaves were rapidly shipped from Africa to Suriname to work on coffee, cocoa, and sugar plantations for the Dutch and other Europeans.

Afro-Surinamese scholar Gloria Wekker argues, for example, that working-class Afro-Surinamese women retained pre-colonial African cultural understandings of gender, sexuality, and spirituality. She, and other theorists, argue that African cultural retentions are found most often in Afro-diasporic communities that either had irregular contact with dominant groups of the host community or that shielded their cultural retentions from their colonizers. As Wekker observes, Surinamese slaves socialized, communicated, and communed with little white cultural, social, or linguistic interference.

Maroons

Escaped enslaved people in Suriname and French Guiana, known as Maroons or Bushinengues, fled to the interior and joined with indigenous peoples to create several independent tribes, among them the Saramaka, the Paramaka, the Ndyuka (Aukan), the Kwinti, the Aluku (Boni), the Matawai, and the Brooskampers. By 1740, the maroons had formed clans and felt strong enough to challenge the Dutch colonists, forcing them to sign peace treaties. Because of their long isolation in interior rainforests, they maintained more African culture than did ethnic Africans in the cities.

From 1972 to 1978, two American professors, S. Allen Counter and David L. Evans, made seven voyages upriver into the maroon areas. Both African Americans, they wanted to contact these communities and learn about the peoples, to see what African cultures they followed.

By the 1980s, the maroons in Suriname had begun to fight for their land rights to protect territory which they had long occupied. They won an important case in 2007 at the Inter-American Court of Human Rights, which ruled they had rights to their traditional lands.

Notable Afro-Surinamese people
 Andwélé Slory
Belfon Aboikoni, Maroon leader
Alice Amafo, politician
Boni, freedom fighter
Remy Bonjasky, kickboxer
 Darl Douglas
Dési Bouterse, politician
 Diego Biseswar
 Dwight Tiendalli
Edson Braafheid, football player
 Ian Maatsen
 Jayden Oosterwolde
Ronnie Brunswijk, politician and rebel leader
Humphrey Campbell, singer
Redlight Boogie, singer
Romeo Castelen, football player
 Romano Denneboom
Nelli Cooman, athlete
Edgar Davids, football player
Wanze Eduards, Maroon leader
Kurt Elshot, football player
Ruud Gullit, football player
Jimmy Floyd Hasselbaink, football player
Ernesto Hoost, kickboxer
Hugo Jabini, politician
Ruth Jacott, singer
Patrick Kluivert, football player
Anton de Kom, resistance fighter and author
Melvin Manhoef, mixed martial artist and kickboxer
Gazon Matodya, Maroon leader
Jan Ernst Matzeliger, inventor
Ché Nunnely, football player
Sophie Redmond, physician and activist
Michael Reiziger, football player
Frank Rijkaard, football player
Jairzinho Rozenstruik, mixed martial artist and kickboxer
Elisabeth Samson, 18th-century coffee plantation owner
Clarence Seedorf, football player
Regilio Tuur, boxer
 Ryan Donk
Virgil van Dijk, football player
Bono Velanti, Maroon leader
Ronald Venetiaan, politician
Gleofilo Vlijter, football player
Letitia Vriesde, athlete
Jules Wijdenbosch, politician
Georginio Wijnaldum, football player
 Crysencio Summerville
 Don Ceder
 Javairô Dilrosun
 Mitchell te Vrede
 Ricardo Moniz
 Alvaro Verwey
 Florian Jozefzoon
 Galgyto Talea
 Kevin Wattamaleo
Gilbert Yvel, mixed martial artist and kickboxer
 Jamilhio Rigters
 Jahri Valentijn

References

Bibliography
 
 

 
Surinamese
Ethnic groups in Suriname